Marayniyuq (Quechua maran, maray batan or grindstone, maray to tear down, to knock down, -ni, -yuq suffixes, "the one with the grind stone", also spelled Maraynioc) is a mountain in the Andes of Peru, about  high . It is located in the Junín Region, Yauli Province, Marcapomacocha District. It lies north of Mishipa Ñawin.

References

Mountains of Peru
Mountains of Junín Region